The Gran Premio Palio del Recioto is a professional one day cycling race held annually in Italy. It is part of UCI Europe Tour in category 1.2U.

Winners

References

Cycle races in Italy
UCI Europe Tour races
Recurring sporting events established in 1961
1961 establishments in Italy